Winifer Santa Campo (born 9 July 1998), simply known as Winifer in Spain, is a Dominican footballer who plays as a centre forward for Spanish club CD Getafe Femenino the Dominican Republic women's national team.

Early life
Santa was born in Santo Domingo.

Club career
Santa has played for  CD Betis San Isidro, Rayo Vallecano B and CD Getafe Femenino in Spain.

International career
Having previously represented the Dominican Republic at under–20 level, Santa made her senior debut on 18 February 2021 in a friendly home match against Puerto Rico. She was team captain in that game.

References

External links

1998 births
Living people
Sportspeople from Santo Domingo
Dominican Republic women's footballers
Women's association football forwards
Rayo Vallecano Femenino players
Dominican Republic women's international footballers
Dominican Republic expatriate women's footballers
Dominican Republic expatriate sportspeople in Spain
Expatriate women's footballers in Spain